Deoxyadenosine diphosphate is a nucleoside diphosphate.  It is related to the common nucleic acid ATP, or adenosine triphosphate, with the -OH (hydroxyl) group on the 2' carbon on the nucleotide's pentose removed (hence the deoxy- part of the name), and with one fewer phosphoryl group than ATP. This makes it also similar to adenosine diphosphate except with a hydroxyl group removed.

Deoxyadenosine diphosphate is abbreviated dADP.

See also
Cofactor
Guanosine
Cyclic adenosine monophosphate

References

Nucleotides
Pyrophosphates
Purines